Dunblane is a ghost town in the Canadian province of Saskatchewan.

The town was on the Canadian National Railway Conquest Subdivision.  Rail service first arrived in 1914, and the town prospered to a population of over 300, until the construction of an oil pipelines made rail transport less viable for the transportation of Turner Valley crude oil.  By 1980 there was little left of the original town site

Notable people
 Steve Buzinski - NHL Hockey Player

See also 

 List of communities in Saskatchewan
 Villages of Saskatchewan

Footnotes

Coteau No. 255, Saskatchewan
Former villages in Saskatchewan
Ghost towns in Saskatchewan